Talaohu Abdul Musafri (born 19 February 1982) is an Indonesian professional footballer who plays as a forward for Liga 3 club Bantul United.

Club career 
He made his name famous when he played for Persiba where he scored 28 goals in 65 appearances. In December 2014, he signed with Barito Putera.

International career 
He was included in the Indonesian squad for the 2011 Asian Cup qualification.

International goals

Honours 
 Indonesia Super League Fair Play Award : 2008–09

References

External links 
 
 

1982 births
Badak Lampung F.C. players
People from Ternate
Sportspeople from North Maluku
Indonesian footballers
Indonesia international footballers
Persiba Balikpapan players
Persija Jakarta players
PSS Sleman players
Arema F.C. players
Perseman Manokwari players
Pelita Bandung Raya players
Liga 1 (Indonesia) players
Indonesian Premier League players
Indonesian Premier Division players
Association football forwards
Association football wingers
Living people